The Filanovsky Oil Field is an oil field located in the Caspian Sea. It was discovered in 1994 and developed by Lukoil. The oil field is owned and operated by Lukoil.

References 

Oil fields of Russia